Hard to Kill is the sixth album by British sludgecore band Raging Speedhorn, released on 23 October 2020. It is the first album to feature new vocalist Dan Cook who replaced John Loughlin who had fronted the band for more than two decades.

Track listing
"Snakebite"
"Doom Machine"
"Spitfire"
"Hard to Kill"
"Hammer Down"
"Hand Of God"
"Brutality"
"The Beast"
"Children Of The Revolution"

References

2020 albums
Raging Speedhorn albums